Ranasan is a village located in Sabarkantha district in the state of Gujarat, India.
The village is located at about 62 km from the state capital, Gandhinagar.

Ranasan postal head office is Harsol .

Demographics 
Gujarati is the Local Language here.

Schools in Ranasan 
Shri C.V Gandhi HighSchool Ranasan
 Smt K A Vora Primary School
Bachapan Vidhyalaya
Royal Public School
Takshshila Prathmic School

Occupation of The People 
Agriculture
Farmers
Animal Husbandry

Mainly Business 
The village mainly Business is Wheat, Coriander, Millet, Cotton, Castor and Vegetables of the crop Agriculture. also other bussines is like shopping mall, cloth stores, phone stores grewup. OdhavMobs Telecom is high rated shop in ranasan.

Near Cities From Ranasan 
Modasa
Himatnagar
Talod
Prantij
Vijapur

References 
Ranasan on FB

Villages in Sabarkantha district
1943 disestablishments in India